Khonakhan Mosque is a mosque in Margilan, Fergana Region, Uzbekistan.

See also
 Islam in Uzbekistan

Mosques in Uzbekistan